Calycolpus australis is a plant species native to the State of Minas Gerais in Brazil. It can be found on poor, rocky soil that supports grasses but few shrubs or trees.

Calycolpus australis is a shrub up to 2 m high. Leaves are ovate to lanceolate, thick and leathery, up to 53 mm long. Flowers are about 3–4 cm across. Fruits are spherical, about 1 cm in diameter, purple and hairy.

The leaves of C. australis contain volatile oils.

References

australis
Flora of Minas Gerais
Plants described in 1998